Attur Nallur is a small village in Somwarpet Taluk in Kodagu District of Karnataka State, India. It comes under Attur Nallur Panchayath. It belongs to Mysore Division. It is located 12 km to the east of District headquarters Madikeri. 28 km from Somvarpet and 234 km from state capital Bangalore.

Kedakal (5km), Nanjarayapatna (6km), Valnur Thyagathur (8km), Kadagadalu (8km), Ibnivalvadi (9km) are the nearby villages to Attur Nallur. Attur Nallur is surrounded by Somvarpet Taluk towards North, Piriyapatna Taluk towards East, Virajpet Taluk towards South and Arkalgud Taluk towards north. 

Madikeri, Sakleshpur, Mangalore, Mattannur and Taliparamba are the nearby cities to Attur Nallur.

It is located in the Somwarpet taluk of Kodagu district in Karnataka.

Schools
 Jnanaganga Residential School

See also
 Kodagu
 Districts of Karnataka

References

External links
 http://Kodagu.nic.in/

Villages in Kodagu district